The Anglican Diocese of Remo is one of 13 within the Anglican Province of Lagos, itself one of 14 provinces within the Church of Nigeria. The current bishop is Michael Fape, who is also Archbishop of the Ecclesiastical Province of Lagos.

Notes

Church of Nigeria dioceses
Dioceses of the Province of Lagos